Chad T. Kelsay (born April 9, 1977) is a former American football linebacker who played one season with the Pittsburgh Steelers of the National Football League (NFL). He was drafted by the Steelers in the seventh round of the 1999 NFL Draft. He played college football at the University of Nebraska and attended Auburn High School in Auburn, Nebraska. He was also a member of the St. Louis Rams.

His brother Chris Kelsay also played in the NFL.

References

External links
Just Sports Stats
Fanbase profile

Living people
1977 births
Players of American football from Nebraska
American football linebackers
Nebraska Cornhuskers football players
Pittsburgh Steelers players
People from Auburn, Nebraska